Thomas Pigott of Doddershall, Buckinghamshire (fl. 1589) was an English politician.

Family
His father, Thomas Pigott of Doddershall (d. 1606) was High Sheriff of Buckinghamshire in 1593–1594, and a justice of the peace for the county. He married twice, firstly to Dorothy Cottenham, daughter and coheiress of Henry Cottenham of Norfolk. They had one son and one daughter. We do not know the name of his second wife, who was a daughter of Sir John Allot, alderman and Lord Mayor of London.

Career
He was a Member (MP) of the Parliament of England for Aylesbury in 1589.

References

Year of birth missing
Year of death missing
People from Buckinghamshire (before 1974)
English MPs 1589